Addi Walka is a tabia or municipality in the Dogu'a Tembien district of the Tigray Region of Ethiopia. The tabia centre is in Kelkele village, located approximately 16 km northeast of the woreda town Hagere Selam.

Geography 
The tabia stretches down from Dogu'a Tembien's northern ridges towards the Agefet valley.  The highest place is the cliff under Arebay (2500 m a.s.l.) and the lowest place along Agefet River (1728 m a.s.l.).

Geology 
From the higher to the lower locations, the following geological formations are present:
 Amba Aradam Formation
 Agula Shale 
 Antalo Limestone 
 Adigrat Sandstone
 Edaga Arbi Glacials  
 Quaternary alluvium and freshwater tufa

Climate 
The rainfall pattern shows a very high seasonality with 70 to 80% of the annual rain falling in July and August. Mean temperature in Kelkele is 18.8 °C, oscillating between average daily minimum of 10.5 °C and maximum of 26.7 °C. The contrasts between day and night air temperatures are much larger than seasonal contrasts.

Springs 
As there are no permanent rivers, the presence of springs is of utmost importance for the local people. The main springs in the tabia are:
 May Deqisa'iri in Bet Moka'i
 Springs along Agefet River

Reservoirs 
In this area with rains that last only for a couple of months per year, reservoirs of different sizes allow harvesting runoff from the rainy season for further use in the dry season. Traditional surface water harvesting ponds, particularly in places without permanent springs, are called rahaya. Horoyo, household ponds, have been recently constructed through campaigns.

Settlements 
The tabia centre Kelkele holds a few administrative offices, a health post, a primary school, and some small shops. There are a few more primary schools across the tabia. The main other populated places are:

Agriculture and livelihood 
The population lives essentially from crop farming, supplemented with off-season work in nearby towns. The land is dominated by farmlands which are clearly demarcated and are cropped every year. Hence the agricultural system is a permanent upland farming system.
The farmers have adapted their cropping systems to the spatio-temporal variability in rainfall.

History and culture

History 
The history of the tabia is strongly confounded with the history of Tembien.

Religion and churches 
Most inhabitants are Orthodox Christians. The following churches are located in the tabia:

Inda Siwa, the local beer houses 
In the main villages, there are traditional beer houses (Inda Siwa), often in unique settings, which are a good place for resting and chatting with the local people. Most renown in the tabia is Tkun Asgedom at Bet Moka'e.

Roads and communication 
The main road Mekelle – Hagere Selam – Abiy Addi runs some 7–12 km south of the tabia. People have the choice to walk to Ala'isa or Tsigereda to find bus services to the towns. A rural access road (sometimes disused) links Addi Walka to the main asphalt road.

Tourism 
Its mountainous nature and proximity to Mekelle makes the tabia fit for tourism.

Geotouristic sites 
The high variability of geological formations and the rugged topography invites for geological and geographic tourism or "geotourism". Geosites in the tabia include especially the dissected, Grand Canyon-like landscapes.

Trekking routes 
A trekking route has been established in this tabia. The track of Gh1, from south to north across the tabia, is not marked on the ground but can be followed using downloaded .GPX files.

Accommodation and facilities 
The facilities are very basic.  One may be invited to spend the night in a rural homestead or ask permission to pitch a tent. Hotels are available in Hagere Selam and Mekelle.

More detailed information 
For more details on environment, agriculture, rural sociology, hydrology, ecology, culture, etc., see the overall page on the Dogu'a Tembien district.

References 

Dogu'a Tembien
Populated places in the Tigray Region